The M-Electrolyte 25th South East Asian Junior and Cadet Table Tennis Championships 2019 were held in Bangkok, Thailand, from 4 to 9 June 2019.

Medal summary

Events

Medal table

See also

2019 World Junior Table Tennis Championships
2019 Asian Junior and Cadet Table Tennis Championships
Asian Table Tennis Union

References

South East Asian Table Tennis Championships
South East Asian Junior and Cadet Table Tennis Championships
South East Asian Junior and Cadet Table Tennis Championships 
South East Asian Junior and Cadet Table Tennis Championships
Table tennis competitions in Thailand
International sports competitions hosted by Thailand
South East Asian Junior and Cadet Table Tennis Championships